The Battle of Sidon was an engagement between the Anglo-Austrian-Ottoman and the Egyptian forces. It ended with the capture of Sidon by the Allies.

Battle 

Admiral Stopford wanted to seize Sidon and entrusted Admiral Napier with this task. Sidon was protected by a citadel and line of wall. With eight ships Napier began shelling the square for 30 minutes. The Anglo-Ottoman forces tried to land twice, but were repelled. Tasked with directing the attack on the southern castle while the ships were still firing, Archduke Friedrich first landed a detachment, which quickly climbed the heights of the banks, and soon afterwards a second, which landed despite the enemy gunfire coming from some houses. After this detachment, combined with a detachment of Englishmen, had positioned itself as a reserve at the entrance to the town, Archduke Friedrich himself, at the head of the first detachment and a few Englishmen, advanced towards the mountain castle, which he climbed first of all. Soon afterwards a detachment of Englishmen, who had entered the city from the north, arrived there, while the Turkish troops were entering from the side of the water castle. By 6 o'clock in the afternoon Sidon was captured. 1,500 Egyptians were taken prisoner.

References 

Sidon
Sidon
Sidon
Sidon
Conflicts in 1840
1840 in Egypt
September 1840 events